Senior aircraftman technician (SAC Tech or formerly SAC(T)) is a rank in the Royal Air Force, ranking between senior aircraftman and corporal and having a NATO rank code of OR-2. SAC Technicians are not NCOs and cannot administratively discipline other personnel.

The rank, which is self-supervisory, was introduced in 2000 to replace junior technician (although junior technicians promoted before this date retain their rank). The rank badge is a three-bladed propeller inside a circle. The rank was renamed air specialist (class 1) technician (AS1(T)) in the Royal Air Force in July 2022.

From March 2005, SACs in technical trades who had attained the Operational Performance Standard were promoted to SAC technician. This rank was introduced to distinguish airmen who have finished trade specific training, though they still require supervision from a corporal or senior NCO.

Previous use of insignia
The insignia of a 3- or 4-bladed propeller surrounded by a circle was originally used after World War II to identify trade apprentices. It fell out of use after a very short period in service.

See also
RAF enlisted ranks

References

Military ranks of the Royal Air Force
Air force ranks